The following is the complete filmography of the American actor, voice artist, and former president of the Screen Actors Guild Ed Asner.

Film

Television

Video games

Audiobooks

Radio
The Odyssey, National Radio Theater, 1981, published by Blackstone Audio – Narrator
Top Secret: The Battle for the Pentagon Papers, LA Theatre Works, 1991, published by LA Theatre Works – Ben Bradlee

See also
 List of awards and nominations received by Ed Asner

External links
 

Male actor filmographies
American filmographies